An incomplete list of events which happened in Italy in 1503:

 Battle of Ruvo
The Battle of Ruvo was fought on 23 February 1503 between a Spanish army under Gonzalo Fernández de Córdoba and Diego de Mendoza and a French army commanded by Jacques de la Palice. The battle was part of the Second Italian War and was fought at the town of Ruvo in the Province of Bari, modern-day Italy. The result was a Spanish victory.

 Battle of Cerignola
 Battle of Garigliano (1503)
 Challenge of Barletta
The Challenge of Barletta (Italian: Disfida di Barletta) was a battle fought near Barletta, southern Italy, on February 13, 1503, on the plains between Corato and Andria.

Births
 Michele Tosini

Deaths
 Iovianus Pontanus
 Antonio Bonfini
 Lorenzo Cybo de Mari
 Alexander VI

References